Madimba is a territory in the Kongo Central province of the Democratic Republic of the Congo. Its seat is the town of Madimba.

The major rivers that cut across Madimba Territory are the Congo and its tributary the Inkisi.  Other rivers include the Lukusu, Luidi, Mfidi, Ngufu, Geba, Wungu, Nsele, Tau, Luvu, Lukunga and Bongolo.

Administrative divisions
Madimba Territory covers 8,260 km and is divided into six administrative divisions or "sectors":
Luidi
Mfidi Malele
Mfuma Kibambi
Ngeba
Ngufu
Wungu (south of Ngeba, north of Mfidi Malele)

References

Territories of Kongo Central Province